Gorky 3: My Universities is a 1940 Soviet drama film directed by Mark Donskoy.

Plot 
The third part of the trilogy of the life and fate of M. Gorky, based on the autobiographical novel of the same name by the writer. Alyosha Peshkov comes to Kazan to study. The university turns out to be an impossible dream for him, and so he begins to look for a job, and has to live without a shelter. Young Peshkov's thoughts about life are no less difficult than life itself. In a moment of despair, he decides to commit suicide.

Starring 
 Nikolai Valbert as Aleksei Pechkov (Gorky) (as N. Valbert)
 Stepan Kayukov as Semenov
 Nikolai Dorokhin as Chatunov
 Nikolai Plotnikov as Nikiforytch
 Lev Sverdlin as The Guardian
 Daniil Sagal as Pletnev
 Mikhail Povolotsky as The Student
 Pavel Shpringfeld as Gratchik
 Vladimir Maruta as Romas
 K. Zubkov as The Beard Baker
 A. Smolko as Pacha the gipsy
 Valentina Dancheva as The Woman (as V. Dancheva)
 Irina Fedotova as Macha
 Pavel Dozhdev as Yacha (as Pavlik Dozhdev)

See also
 The Childhood of Maxim Gorky (first part of trilogy)

References

External links 

1940 films
1940s Russian-language films
Soviet drama films
1940 drama films
Soviet black-and-white films